Dennis (Denny) W. Schulstad (born December 11, 1944) is a retired Air Force Brigadier General and a former representative on the Minneapolis City Council.

In retirement he is a member of several non-profit boards and commissions.

Education 
1966' University of Minnesota

Bachelor of Art in Public Speech / Public Relations

1989' Harvard University

Program for Senior Executives of Government

Career

Brigadier General at United States Air Force (1966–2000) 

Schulstad served 35 years active duty and in the Air Force Reserve. Assignments included the Air Force Academy, March AFB, Keesler AFB and Langley AFB. Roles included Public Affairs, Strategic Planning and work at Headquarters TAC and Air Combat Command. He commanded a Student Squadron with 850 members and commanded the 43-member Air Force Academy Liaison Officer program in Minnesota.

Minneapolis City Council (1976–1997) 

Schulstad represented the 12th Ward for 22 years.

Military education background 

1978 Squadron Officer School

1981 Air Command and Staff College

1984 Air War College

Military assignments 

 October 1966 – June 1967, administrative officer, 3408th Student Squadron, Keesler AFB
 July 1967 – June 1968, Commander, 3408th Student Squadron, Keesler AFB
 June 1968 – March 1970, recruiting officer, Minneapolis, Minn.
 March 1970 – December 1970, personnel officer, 934th Tactical Air Group, Minneapolis, Minn.
 December 1970 – December 1971, quality control officer, 934th Tactical Air Group, Minneapolis, Minn.
 December 1971 – November 1978, U.S. Air Force Academy liaison officer, Colorado Springs, Colo.
 November 1978 – January 1984, admissions liaison officer, U.S. Air Force Academy and Air Force ROTC, Lowry AFB
 January 1984 – November 1984, Commander, Admissions Liaison Office, Minnesota Region, Minneapolis
 November 1984 – August 1991, individual mobilization augmentee to the Director of Public Affairs, Headquarters 15th Air Force, March AFB
 September 1991 – July 1992, individual mobilization augmentee to the Director of Public Affairs, Headquarters Tactical Air Command, Langley AFB
 July 1992 – March 1994, individual mobilization augmentee to the Director of Public Affairs, Headquarters Air Combat Command, Langley AFB
 March 1994 – April 2000, mobilization assistant to the director of plans and programs, Headquarters ACC, Langley AFB

Political background 
Schulstad was the Republican candidate for Lieutenant Governor with Cal Ludeman during the 1986 Minnesota Gubernatorial race. The pair won the Republican primary election and lost the general election to Governor Rudy Perpich.

Major awards & achievements 

 Employer Support of the Guard and Reserve (ESGR) Lifetime Achievement Award (2021)
 University of Minnesota Alumni of Notable Achievement
 Air Force Academy Lifetime Achievement Award
 State of Minnesota Distinguished Service Medal
 University of Minnesota Alumni Service Award
 Secretary of Defense Medal for Outstanding Public Service
 Air Force Distinguished Public Service Award
 Inaugural Hall of Fame, Roosevelt High School
 Air Force Commendation Medal with two oak leaf clusters 
 Air Force Outstanding Unit Award with oak leaf cluster 
 National Defense Service Medal 
 Armed Forces Reserve Medal with hourglass
 Outstanding admissions liaison officer commander 
 Outstanding additional duty admissions liaison officer in the nation 
 Air Force Recruiting Special Achievement Award

Professional memberships 

 Commodore and President, Minneapolis Aquatennial Association 
 Promotions and arrangements task force, Super Bowl XXVI 
 National vice chairman, the President's Dinner (year?)
 National President, 63,000 member University of Minnesota Alumni Association, 2007-2008
 Minnesota State Chairman, Employer Support of the Guard and Reserve (ESGR)
 Co-founder and President, Minnesotans Military Appreciation Fund

Dates of military promotion

References 

1944 births
Living people
Harvard University alumni
Minneapolis City Council members
United States Air Force generals
University of Minnesota alumni